Messiah of Evil (later also shown under the title Dead People) is a 1973 American supernatural horror film co-written, co-produced, and co-directed by Willard Huyck and Gloria Katz, and starring Marianna Hill, Michael Greer, Anitra Ford, Royal Dano, and Elisha Cook Jr. Its plot follows a woman who travels to a remote coastal town in California to find her missing artist father; upon arrival, she finds herself in the midst of a series of bizarre incidents.

Released theatrically in the spring of 1973, it would later be re-released in 1983 under the alternate title Dead People.

Directors Huyck and Katz are the husband-and-wife team who would subsequently direct Howard the Duck as well as produce screenplays for American Graffiti and Indiana Jones and the Temple of Doom.

Plot
A young woman named Arletty (Marianna Hill) drives to the beach town of Point Dume, California, to visit her estranged father, an artist. She finds his beachfront house abandoned. He left a diary in which he addresses her specifically. In it he complains about darkness consuming the town, and horrible nightmares he is having, and implores Arletty to never, ever look for him. His letter tells her to talk to the owner of the art gallery, who sells his paintings. The gallery owner says he has none of her father's paintings, does not sell them, no one ever comes in looking to buy his works, and says he doesn't know where he went. He says Point Dume is "an artist colony" and he only vaguely remembers her father (his paintings are eerie pop art portraits of groups of people in black, white, and gray, standing; the men are always dressed in black suits, white shirts, and black ties, like dead men at a funeral). It is never clear if these are townspeople, or figures from his visions, or both.

Arletty meets a visiting Portuguese-American aristocrat Thom (Michael Greer) and his two extremely provocative, groupie-like female companions, Toni (Joy Bang) and Laura (Anitra Ford). Back at his motel, Thom interviews Charlie, (Elisha Cook, Jr.) the local town eccentric. Charlie speaks at length about "the blood moon" and "the dark stranger" and how he has lived through both. He says very soon it will be the 100 year anniversary of the first appearance of the "dark stranger." He will return, the moon will turn red, and the town will be overrun with evil. Charlie warns Arletty about her father, he says he is "one of them" now. Moments later he is murdered off screen.

Thom, Toni, and Laura are kicked out of their hotel after interviewing Charlie, and stay at Arletty's father's house. Arletty reads through her father's bizarre journal entries, in which he reveals his body temperature is 85 degrees, and he mentions fighting his "condition." Meanwhile, each night, creatures gather on the beach in front of bonfires, staring straight up at the moon. The locals call it "The Waiting."

Late one evening before making a trip to San Francisco, Laura goes into the local Ralphs supermarket, and is devoured by a hoard of vampires who are feasting on raw meat; the following day, Toni goes to see a movie, and is also eaten by the other theater patrons, who are the same creatures. That evening, the "blood moon" rises, and the town's residents turn into vampires, and the titular "Messiah of Evil" returns. Through voice-over of Charlie's taped interviews, we learn that this "Messiah" was a former minister and a Donner Party survivor from the late 19th century turned vampire/cannibal, who has come to spread his new "religion" and lead his people up the coast and inland. While Thom hides, two policemen in riot gear drive up and fire their guns into a swarm of vampires; however, one of the cops suddenly begins to bleed, causing his now-former partner to shoot him and flee. Undaunted, the undead cop shoots his former ally, and he and the other vampires go to feast on his flesh.

Thom returns to the house, where he finds Arletty half-crazed; she is cold, cannot feel pain, and thinks she may be dead or undead. She even finds a bug crawling around in her mouth and immediately vomits up various beetles, mealworms and an anole. While Thom was gone, Arletty was visited by her father, who had warned her not to follow him and begs her to leave to tell the world about Point Dume. He then attacks her, reluctantly giving in to his "vampire" urges, and after she stabs him with garden shears before burning him alive. Startled by Thom, she stabs him in the arm with the shears. The two of them flee to the beach, but the ersatz vampires follow them, even in broad daylight. They swim out to the breakers, but Thom drowns. Arletty survives and is captured by the townspeople. Instead of killing her, she is let free under the condition that she spread word of  the religious movement throughout California and the world. This causes her to be locked up in an insane asylum. Each day, all day, she sits in the sun painting, dreading the day the Messiah and his followers come to take her away.

Cast
 Michael Greer as Thom
 Marianna Hill as Arletty
 Joy Bang as Toni
 Anitra Ford as Laura
 Royal Dano as Joseph Lang
 Elisha Cook Jr. as Charlie
 Charles Dierkop as Gas Attendant
 Bennie Robinson as Albino Trucker
 Walter Hill as Stabbing Victim in Prologue

Analysis
Katz later said the film "was a real bowwow", though Huyck claimed in 1984 that "it appeared on a marquee in a Woody Allen film, and Film Comment called it 'one of the top 10 classic, overlooked horror films of all time.'"

Kim Newman considers this film to be a  "neglected" and "surreal" horror film, which has both a convoluted narrative and a peculiar atmosphere. He draws attention to details such as the vanished father being a death-obsessed painter, the daughter falling in with a group of hedonists, the town people turning into ghouls. He also notes that the "dark stranger" was a sinister preacher, whose awaited return comes from the sea. He found all these details to point to the influence of H. P. Lovecraft on the film, while the depiction of the undead derives from their depiction in Night of the Living Dead. Newman points to the "doomed derelict", whose apt warnings are ignored, to be a cliché deriving from gothic fiction.

Ian Cooper comments that the undead of the film seem to be ghoul-like, and zombie-like vampires. He comments that there was a trend in this direction following the release of Night of the Living Dead (1968), and Messiah was one of the films that followed it. He cites among other examples Let's Scare Jessica to Death (1971), The Return of Count Yorga (1971), Deathdream/Dead of Night (1972), and Lemora (1975).

According to author Glenn Kay, one of the key weaknesses of the film is that "important plot points are never clarified". He notes that the motivations of the lead characters are never properly explained. In particular, Thom is identified as a collector of old legends. But his motivations are even more obscure than those of his female companions. Newman points that the strange behavior of the seemingly normal characters adds to the surreal feeling of the film. The titular Messiah of Evil is never properly identified. Kay finds it problematic that no character reads the father's diary to the end, until it is too late to prevent their fate. It is unclear whether the character Thom is the "dark stranger" himself (Michael Greer does in fact play the "dark stranger" in the flashback sequence), a reincarnation, or a descendant. In an interview with Michael Greer to promote the film The Gay Deceivers, Greer stated that he would be playing "the devil's son" in his upcoming film Messiah of Evil.

The process of the transformation for the infected is depicted on screen, but said process is also never really explained. The film features a distinctive pattern of symptoms for the infected population of Point Dume. They start bleeding from the eyes, while becoming insensitive to pain. They consume meat regardless of its source. They all seem to feast on human flesh,  several of them consume the entire meat section of a supermarket, and one of them is seen eating a mouse. Once fully transformed, they reportedly "become mere shells of their former selves". They all eagerly await the return of the so-called "dark stranger", passing the time by lighting bonfires on the beach and gathering round them. When the long-waited return occurs, they are bound to spread their disease to other areas of California.

The scene of a victim chased through a supermarket and devoured in one of its aisles remains a highlight for the film, though the death is implied and not depicted. It seems to be a depiction of consumerism, in a similar way to the satire of consumerism in Dawn of the Dead (1978). Newman finds the highlight of the film to be the scene set in the movie theater.  Toni, the "nymphet" as he calls her, is watching a collage of scenes from the Western Gone with the West (1974). Meanwhile, the decayed theater is increasingly filled up with undead people.

Brendan Riley notes that the zombie films of George A. Romero are known for their social criticism, but he believes that the same can be said of non-Romero films of the genre. He notes Messiah as an example. The undead hordes consist of strait-laced, suit-wearing people, while their targets consist of a long-haired dandy and his two lovers.

Newman places the film within a specific era of horror film, which he names "the American Nightmare". He defines it as the era starting with Night of the Living Dead (1968) and ending with Dawn of the Dead (1978). He defines it as an era where writer-directors started their own film projects, and then went in search of business partners and shady distributors. The films had commercial value, but the creators managed to express their personal concerns within the framework of the genre. He places Messiah among the one-off oddities produced in this era, and notes that such oddities were regularly released alongside the marketable hits which spawned sequels. Newman believes the era properly ended in the early 1980s, when formula-driven franchises such as Friday the 13th and A Nightmare on Elm Street started dominating the genre.

Matt Serafini of Dread Central identifies the film as an early example of "nightmare" films, meaning that it portrays many dream-like, psychedelic scenes in an eerie, unsettling atmosphere.

Production

Principal photography of Messiah of Evil began on September 1, 1971 in California, on a budget of under $1 million.

Release

Theatrical distribution
The film premiered in Los Angeles on April 23, 1973. It was released under several alternate titles in the following years, such as Return of the Living Dead, Revenge of the Screaming Dead, and The Second Coming. The film was involved in a dispute in the 1970s over its title, when a Chicago distributor released it under the title Return of the Living Dead. The title was chosen to make it sound as part of the Living Dead franchise and this was misleading. The Laurel Group (also known as Laurel Entertainment), founded in 1976 by George A. Romero and Richard P. Rubinstein, took legal action against this use of the title. Eventually the Motion Picture Association of America decided that Romero did not hold exclusive rights to the terms Living Dead, but ruled against the use of the misleading title for Messiah. It would subsequently receive theatrical release again in 1983 under the title Dead People.

Home media
The film was released on DVD on October 27, 2009, fully remastered by Code Red DVD. A fortieth anniversary Blu-ray edition was released by Code Red in 2013. It had previous been released as a double feature DVD in 2003 paired with The Devil's Nightmare.

Critical response

Kevin Thomas of the Los Angeles Times dismissed the film as a "thoroughly dismal horror picture that is sleep-inducing rather than hair-raising". Nick Spacek from Starburst Magazine rated the film a perfect score of 10 out of 10, calling it "unsettling", and praised the film's soundtrack, and disturbing visuals. Ian Jane of DVD Talk gave the film four out of five stars, praising the film's atmosphere, performances, tension, and visual style, calling it "a high point in creativity for the independent American horror film movement of the 1970s".

Legacy
The film was listed at #95 on IndieWire's The 100 Greatest Horror Movies of All-Time, with the film's entry stating, "While Messiah of Evil is lesser known, it’s full of iconic and memorable scenes that recall to mind some of George A. Romero’s best work."

See also
 List of American films of 1973

References

Sources

External links
 
 
 
 

1973 films
1973 horror films
1973 independent films
American independent films
Films about cannibalism
American vampire films
American zombie films
Films set in a movie theatre
Films set in California
Films shot in California
Films shot in Los Angeles
Films directed by Willard Huyck
Films directed by Gloria Katz
Films with screenplays by Willard Huyck
Films with screenplays by Gloria Katz
Films produced by Gloria Katz
Films produced by Willard Huyck
1973 directorial debut films
1970s English-language films
1970s American films